Matt Lentz (born November 19, 1982) is a former American football guard. He was signed by the New York Giants as an undrafted free agent in 2006. He played college football at Michigan.

Lentz was also a member of the Pittsburgh Steelers, Tampa Bay Buccaneers, Detroit Lions, Florida Tuskers, California Redwoods and Sacramento Mountain Lions.

High school
Lentz attended Ortonville Brandon High school in Ortonville, Michigan.

College career
Lentz attended the University of Michigan, earning his first varsity letter as a sophomore in 2002. He went on to become a three-year starter at right guard, and a two-time All-Big Ten first-teamer. He majored in General Studies.

Professional career

New York Giants
Lentz was signed by the New York Giants as an undrafted free agent in 2006. He played his first game for the Giants in their fourth preseason game in 2006, helping protect backup quarterback Jared Lorenzen complete 10-of-15 passes for 116 yards in a 31-23 victory over the New England Patriots.

Lentz did not start a regular season game during his time with the Giants, and was released during the final roster cuts before the 2007 regular season. The day after, Lentz was signed to the Giants practice squad. September 11, 2007, Lentz had his contract terminated from the practice squad.

Detroit Lions
Lentz was signed by the Detroit Lions April 7, 2009, only to be waived April 28.

Florida Tuskers
Lentz signed with the Florida Tuskers of the United Football League September 9, 2009.

References

External links
 Pittsburgh Steelers bio

1982 births
Living people
Sportspeople from Oakland County, Michigan
Players of American football from Michigan
American football offensive tackles
American football offensive guards
Michigan Wolverines football players
New York Giants players
Pittsburgh Steelers players
Tampa Bay Buccaneers players
Detroit Lions players
Florida Tuskers players
Sacramento Mountain Lions players